Hoopers may refer to: 

Hoopers (department store), a British retailer
The Hoopers, Japanese musicians
Rivers Hoopers, a Nigerian basketball team
People who practice hooping

See also
Hooper (disambiguation)